Cristal del Mar Montañez Arocha (born 1960) is a Venezuelan beauty pageant titleholder. She was Miss Venezuela for 1977, and was a semi-finalist in the Miss Universe pageant held in Santo Domingo in the Dominican Republic on July 16 of that year.

During the presidency of Hugo Chavez she became active in politics. She participated in the Resistencia Civil de Venezolanos en el Exterior as an international coordinator, and was president of the International Venezuelan Council for Democracy from 2003 to 2008.

References

1960 births
Living people
Miss Universe 1977 contestants
Miss Venezuela winners
People from Caracas